is the sixth studio album by Japanese band Mucc, released on April 26, 2006 in Japan, and on May 12, 2006 in Europe, via Gan-Shin. The album contains nine tracks and has a playing time of 30:46, making it the band's shortest one to date.  According to guitarist Miya, the album is a B-side to their previous album Hōyoku. The first press came housed in a digipack featuring different artwork as well. The album reached number 29 on the Oricon chart.

Track listing

Note
 A re-recording of "Yūbeni" was featured on their 2021 best album Myojo.

References 

Mucc albums
2006 albums